was a Japanese architect, architectural historian, and critic. He is recognized as the leading architect and architectural theorist of early 20th-century Imperial Japan.

Biography
Second son of a doctor in Yonezawa, present-day Yamagata Prefecture, Itō was educated in Tokyo. From 1889 to 1892 he studied under Tatsuno Kingo in the Department of Architecture at the Imperial University. Josiah Conder was still teaching in the department, while Ernest Fenollosa and Okakura Kakuzō were also influential in the formation of Itō's ideas. For graduation he designed a Gothic cathedral and wrote a dissertation on architectural theory. His doctoral thesis was on the architecture of Hōryū-ji. He was professor of architecture at the Imperial University from 1905, then of Waseda University from 1928.

Itō travelled widely, to the Forbidden City with photographer Ogawa Kazumasa in 1901 and subsequently, after fourteen months in China, to Burma, India, Sri Lanka, Turkey, Europe and the United States. Later he was involved in the planning of Chōsen Jingū in Seoul and a survey of the monuments of Rehe in Manchukuo. He incorporated elements of the diverse architectural styles he encountered in his many writings and approximately one hundred design projects. He was also a leading proponent of the Imperial Crown style of architecture, which had been developed for the Japanese Empire by architect Shimoda Kikutaro.

Itō helped formulate the Ancient Temples and Shrines Preservation Law of 1897, an early measure to protect the Cultural Properties of Japan. He is also credited with coining the Japanese term for architecture, namely  (lit. 'erection of buildings') in place of the former  (lit. 'study of making houses'). A member of the Japan Academy, in 1943 he was awarded the Order of Culture. Itō has more recently been criticised, with specific reference to his writings on Ise Grand Shrine, for having 'blurred a religio-political discourse with an architectural discourse'.

Projects

See also

 List of Japanese architects
 List of Important Cultural Properties of Japan (Shōwa period: structures)
 An Artist of the Floating World

References

External links
 CiNii Article Finder for publications by and about Itō Chūta

Japanese architects
1867 births
1954 deaths
University of Tokyo alumni
Japanese architectural historians
People from Yamagata Prefecture
Imperial Crown Style architecture